Żabianka is a neighbourhood of Gdańsk and a quarter of:
Żabianka-Wejhera-Jelitkowo-Tysiąclecia, an administrative district of Gdańsk

Żabianka may also refer to the following villages:
Żabianka, Lublin Voivodeship (east Poland)
Żabianka, Masovian Voivodeship (east-central Poland)